An Edict of Toleration was decreed by King Kamehameha III of Hawaii on June 17, 1839, which allowed for the establishment of the Hawaii Catholic Church. The religious traditions of ancient Hawaii were preferred by Kings Kamehameha and Kamehameha II, with the Roman Catholic Church being suppressed in the Kingdom of Hawaii. Later, during the regency of Kaahumanu and the child king Kamehameha III, the Congregational church was the preferred Christian denomination. Kamehameha III issued the edict under the threat of force by the French government, as the French were seeking to protect the work of the Congregation of the Sacred Hearts of Jesus and Mary. The 1840 Constitution later enshrined religious liberty. Under this threat from the French, King Kamehameha III paid $20,000 in compensation for the deportation of priests and the incarceration and torture of converts.

References

1839 in law
1839 in Hawaii
History of Catholicism in the United States
Christianity in Hawaii
Hawaiian Kingdom
Edicts of toleration
1839 in Christianity